Milas Rural District is in the Central District of Lordegan County, Chaharmahal and Bakhtiari province, Iran. At the census of 2006, its population was 34,258 in 6,493 households; there were 31,092 inhabitants in 7,099 households at the following census of 2011; and in the most recent census of 2016, the population of the rural district was 34,885 in 8,899 households. The largest of its 55 villages was Shahrak-e Baraftab-e Shirani, with 6,895 people.

References 

Lordegan County

Rural Districts of Chaharmahal and Bakhtiari Province

Populated places in Chaharmahal and Bakhtiari Province

Populated places in Lordegan County